José Mariano Rotea (1732 in Mexico City, Mexico – 1799 in Bologna, Italy) was a Jesuit missionary on the Baja California peninsula who played a key role in the rediscovery of the peninsula's prehistoric Great Murals rock art.

Rotea was born in Mexico City and served as missionary at San Ignacio in what is now the state of Baja California Sur, Mexico, from 1759 until the Jesuits were expelled from New Spain in 1768. He lived in exile in Bologna, Italy.

Rotea wrote an account of his observations and speculations concerning the remains of the peninsula's prehistoric inhabitants. This was included in a manuscript by his fellow missionary Miguel del Barco and published by the Jesuit historian Francisco Javier Clavijero. One subject of Rotea's account was an hypothesized race of prehistoric giants, supposedly attested by oral traditions, outsized living areas, and paintings placed high on the walls or ceilings of rock shelters. In his investigations into this matter, Rotea carried out what were probably the earliest archaeological excavations on the peninsula, in order to recover bones from a supposed giant. Of more lasting influence was his first reporting of the existence large painted human and animal figures in the region's rock shelters, in a style later labelled the Great Murals.

References

1732 births
1799 deaths
People from Mexico City
Mexican Jesuits
History of Baja California
Roman Catholic missionaries in New Spain
Archaeologists of the Baja California peninsula
Jesuits expelled from the Americas